The 1916 Massachusetts gubernatorial election was held on November 7, 1916.

Republican primary

Governor

Candidates
Samuel W. McCall, incumbent Governor

Results

Lieutenant Governor

Candidates
Calvin Coolidge, incumbent Lieutenant Governor

Results
Lieutenant Governor Coolidge was unopposed for the Republican nomination.

Democratic primary

Governor

Candidates
Charles H. Cole, Adjutant General of Massachusetts and former Boston Police and Fire Commissioner
Frederick Mansfield, former Treasurer and Receiver-General of Massachusetts

Results

Lieutenant Governor

Candidates
Thomas P. Riley, former chairman of the State Democratic Committee and president of the Boston United Irish League of America

Results
Riley was unopposed for the Democratic nomination.

General election

Candidates
 James Hayes, perennial candidate from Plymouth (Socialist Labor)
 Chester R. Lawrence, perennial candidate from Boston (Prohibition)
Frederick Mansfield, former Treasurer and Receiver-General of Massachusetts (Democratic)
Samuel W. McCall, incumbent Governor (Republican)
 Dan A. White, candidate for Governor in 1909 and 1910 (Socialist)

Results

See also
 1916 Massachusetts legislature

References

Bibliography

Governor
1916
Massachusetts
November 1916 events